The Philippine State College of Aeronautics (PhilSCA) is a state college in the Philippines specializing in aeronautics and aviation. Its main campus is in Pasay, Metro Manila, with other campuses located across the country: Floridablanca, Pampanga; Lipa, Batangas; and Lapu-Lapu City. It is the only institution in the Philippines that offers masters and doctoral programs in aeronautical education and management.

In 2012, PhilSCA was awarded by the Professional Regulation Commission (PRC) as the Number 1 Aeronautical School in the Country as it gained high percentage of board passers and for being Top 1 in the PRC Aeronautical Engineering Board Examination for almost 7 years in a row from 2004 until October 2012.

History 
The school was initially established in 1967 as Basa Air Base Community College under AFP Regulation G. 168-342 issued by the Armed Forces of the Philippines dated April 1968 under the Department of National Defense to address the problem plaguing the 5th Fighter Wing of the Philippine Air Force stationed at Basa Air Base, Floridablanca, Pampanga.

In 1977, Basa Air Base College (BABC) established an annex in Nichols Air Base (currently Villamor Air Base) in Pasay known as BABC-Annex using the classroom of the Pasay City South High School for afternoon and evening classes.

In the same year, a satellite campus was established in Fernando Air Base in Lipa, Batangas.

Also in the same year, President Ferdinand E. Marcos signed Presidential Decree No. 1078 converting Basa Air Base Community College to Philippine Air Force College of Aeronautics with its main campus at Villamor Air Base, Pasay, Metro Manila. Although with state college status, its charter did not provide for government subsidy as it was considered as a non-profit and non-stock educational institution. It was envisioned by Philippine Air Force authorities to be the Philippine Air Force Academy to solve its problem in the procurement and training of its officer pilots through the merging of the Philippine Air Force Flying School and the Philippine Air Force Regular Officer Procurement Program.

In 1979, another satellite campus was established in Mactan Benito Ebuen Air Base Campus in Lapulapu City in Mactan, Cebu.

On June 3, 1992, House Bill 26650 was signed into law as Republic Act. No. 7605 by then President Corazon C. Aquino converting Philippine Air Force College of Aeronautics into a state college known as the Philippine State College of Aeronautics.

In 1994, its Board of Trustees approved the creation of its own flight school that will train students for private pilot and commercial pilot. In 1997, it acquired its first trainer plane --- a SOCATA TB-9C Tampico aircraft (RP-2200) which was donated by Senator Raul Roco from his country-wide development fund and another was purchased for P10 million from PhilSCA Development Fund on June 3, 1992.

In 2009, Dr. Enerico M. Sampang was dismissed as College President of the Philippine State College of Aeronautics by the Office of the Ombudsman and immediately replaced by Atty. Carmelita Yadao-Sison, CHED Deputy Executive Director as an OIC (Office in Charge) of the Philippine State College of Aeronautics.

June 1, 2010, Dr. Bernard R. Ramirez, former Vice-President for Administration and Finance, was appointed as the new and 5th College President of the Philippine State College of Aeronautics replacing Atty. Carmelita Yadao-Sison as an OIC.

On July 8, 2010, the college was transferred from its original location at Manlunas St. Villamor Air Base, Pasay (currently Newport City) to its new site at Piccio Garden, Villamor, Pasay (in front of South Luzon Expressway Sales Exit)

On December 15, 2011, the PhilSCA-BAB campus made a groundbreaking ceremony of the newly donated lot for the relocation of the said campus at the Resettlement Area, in Floridablanca, Pampanga. When the said campus relocated to the new site, it was no longer BAB Campus, it became Basa Palmayo Campus.

In June 2014, Governor Lilia Pineda inaugurated the new constructed two-storey building of the PhilSCA Basa-Palmayo campus funded by the local government of Pampanga through the approval of the Provincial Board Members.

Former names 
 Basa Air Base Community College (June 1969 to January 26, 1977)
 Philippine Air Force College of Aeronautics (January 26, 1977 to June 3, 1992)
 Philippine State College of Aeronautics (June 3, 1992 to present)

Campuses 

Upcoming campuses
PhilSCA – Guimaras
PhilSCA – Medellin, Cebu

Organization

Board of Trustees 
Under the Republic Act 8292, Higher Education Modernization Act of 1997. The governing body of state universities and colleges is hereby in the Board of Regents for universities and in the Board of Trustees for colleges which shall be composed of the following:

Academic programs

Institute of Engineering and Technology 
Certified Approved Training Organization (ATO) by the CAAP 
Level II AACCUP accredited: Aeronautical Engineering and Aircraft Maintenance Technology 
Level I AACCUP accredited: Aviation Electronics Technology

 Bachelor of Science in Aeronautical Engineering (BSAeE)
 Bachelor of Science in Air Transportation Specializing in Commercial Flying (BSAT)
 Bachelor of Science in Aircraft Maintenance Technology (BSAMT)
 Bachelor of Science in Aviation Electronics Technology (BSAET)
 Associate in Aircraft Maintenance Technology (AAMT)
 Associate in Aviation Electronics Technology (AAET)

Institute of Computer Studies 
Level II AACCUP accredited: Information Management major in Airline Operation 
Level II AACCUP accredited: Aviation Information Technology
 Bachelor of Science in Computer
 Bachelor of Science in Aviation Information Technology  (BSAIT)
 Bachelor of Science in Aviation Information System (BSAIS)
 Associate in Aviation Information Technology  (AAIT)
 Associate in Information Management major in Airline Operation (AIM)

Institute of Liberal Arts and Sciences 
 Bachelor of Science in Aviation Communication major in Flight Operations
 Bachelor of Science in Aviation Logistics
 Bachelor of Science in Aviation Tourism major in Travel Management
 Bachelor of Science in Aviation Safety and Security Management

Institute of Graduate Studies 
 Master of Education in Aeronautical Management (MEAM)
 Master in Public Administration (MPA)

Publications 
The official student newspaper of the College shall be known as the Aeronautica in Villamor Campus, Aerodite in Basa-Palmayo Campus, Aeropioneer in Fernando Air Base Campus and Aerotalk in Mactan Air Base Campus.

Notable alumni 
  Lt. Gen. William K. Hotchkiss III, AFP (Ret.) – Director General, Civil Aviation Authority of the Philippines (CAAP)

References

External links 
 
 PAFCA Act – Presidential Degree 1078 converting Basa Air Base Community College into the Philippine Air Force College of Aeronautics.
 PhilSCA Act – Republic Act 7605 converting the Philippine Air Force College of Aeronautics into a state college to be known as the Philippine State College of Aeronautics.

1969 establishments in the Philippines
Aviation schools in the Philippines
Education in Pasay
Educational institutions established in 1969
State universities and colleges in Metro Manila